Philipp von Zesen, also Filip Cösius or Caesius (originally Ph. Caesien, Filip Zesen, Filip von Zesen, in Latin Philippus Caesius à Fürstenau, Philippus Caesius à Zesen) (8 October 1619 O.S. – 13 November 1689 O.S.) was a German poet, hymnist and writer. Some of his works are published under his pen name Ritterhold von Blauen.

Biography
Von Zesen was born in Priorau near Dessau. From 1639 to 1641 he studied rhetorics and poetry at the University of Wittenberg.
During the war years from 1642 to 1648 von Zesen lived in the Dutch Republic working as a translator.
In 1648 he returned to his hometown of Priorau and was accepted to the Fruitbearing Society in 1649.
From 1656 he worked in the Dutch Republic again, being a major contributor to Elsevier publishing company.
When he married Maria Becker in 1672 he moved to Hamburg where he spent the rest of his life.

Style
Although his purist language found many opponents, a number of the neologisms he coined are still in use in the German language today, co-existing with loanwords he sought to replace. Examples include "Abstand" for "Distanz" (distance), "Leidenschaft" for "Passion" (passion), or "Rechtschreibung" for "Orthographie" (orthography).

Other more native words he promoted include: Angelpunkt (Pol), Anschrift (Adresse), Ausflug (Exkursion), Beifügung (Apposition), Beistrich (Komma), Besprechung (Rezension), Blutzeuge (Märtyrer), Bücherei (Bibliothek), Emporkömmling (Parvenü), Entwurf (Projekt), Farbgebung (Kolorit), Freistaat (Republik), Gesichtskreis (Horizont, Panorama), Glaubensbekenntnis (Credo), Gotteshaus (Tempel), Grundstein (Fundament), Kreislauf (Zirkulation), Letzter Wille (Testament), Mundart (Dialekt), Nachruf (Nekrolog), Sinngedicht (Epigramm), Sterblichkeit (Mortalität), Verfasser (Autor), Vollmacht (Plenipotenz), Wahlspruch (Devise), Weltall (Universum).

Selected works
 Melpomene (1638) 
 Deutscher Helicon (1640)
 Himmlische Kleio (1641)
 FrühlingsLust oder Lob-, Lust- und Liebeslieder (1642) 
 Poetischer Rosen-Wälder Vorschmack (1642), Pastoral
 Hooch-Deutsche Spraachübrung (1643) 
 Liebesbeschreibung Lysanders und Kalisten (1644), translation of Vital d'Audiguier's Lysandre et Caliste
 Die Adriatische Rosemund (1645)
 Lustinne (1645)
 Die afrikanische Sofonisbe (1646)
 Kurze gründl. Anleitung zur Höflichkeit (1649)
 Leo Belgicus (1656)
 Coelum Astronomico-Poeticum (1662)
 Beschreibung der Stadt Amsterdam (Description of Amsterdam) (1664) 
 Schöne Hamburgerin (1668) Songs
 Assenat (1670) 
 Reiselieder (1677)
 Simson (1679)

Footnotes

References 
 Hugo Harbrecht: Philipp von Zesen als Sprachreiniger. Karlsruhe in Baden: M. Gillardon, 1912
 Eberhard Lindhorst: Philipp von Zesen und der Roman der Spätantike. Ein Beitrag zu Theorie und Technik des barocken Romans. Göttingen: Univ. Diss., 1955 (Neudruck 1997)
 Hans Obermann: Studien über Philipp von Zesens Romane. Göttingen: Univ. Diss., 1932
 Chrystèle Schielein: Philipp von Zesen: Orthographiereformer mit niederländischen Vorbildern?. Erlangen: Univ. Diss., 2002
 Maximilian Bergengruen; Dieter Martin (Hg.): Philipp von Zesen. Wissen – Sprache – Literatur. Tübingen 2008

1619 births
1689 deaths
People from Anhalt-Bitterfeld
17th-century German poets
Imperial counts palatine
German male poets
17th-century German male writers